Carl Ignaz Anton Demmer, also Karl, (baptised 11 February 1766 – after 1824) was an operatic tenor at the Vienna court opera, and possibly Florestan in the first version of Beethoven's opera Fidelio on 20 November 1805, then titled Leonore, oder Der Triumph der ehelichen Liebe.

Life 
He began his artistic career as a choir singer at various churches in Cologne. Around 1786, he became an opera singer, who is first documented at the society of Gustav Friedrich Wilhelm Großmann and its co-director Christian Wilhelm Klos in Cologne. The music director of the company was Friedrich August Burgmüller. Together with Burgmüller, Demmer then moved to the Theater Bonn, which was opened on 3 January 1789.

At Pentecost 1790, he moved to the troupe of J. A. Dietrich, which played mainly in the Netherlands. He met Karl Friedrich Krüger and his sister Caroline, whom he soon married. The troupe also played at the just opened .

On 4 February 1791 Demmer and his wife came to the Weimar court theatre, where both were supported by Johann Wolfgang von Goethe. At Pentecost 1794, the couple appeared in Frankfurt. On 5 May Goethe's mother wrote to her son in Weimar:

On 20 December 1799, Demmer gave a concert in Frankfurt to which he invited all his patrons. At the beginning of 1804, he signed a contract with the Vienna court opera, which was regretted in Frankfurt. A review noted his "strong steady voice with a high range". On 27 February 1804, Demmer gave his farewell performance in Frankfurt in the title role of Mozart's La clemenza di Tito. A few days later he travelled via Regensburg to Vienna where he arrived with his family on 7 March. Demmer made his debut there on 20 June 1804 at the court opera as Edwinsky in the Vienna premiere of François-Adrien Boieldieu's Die Verwiesenen auf Kamtschatka. The  Vienna correspondent of the Allgemeine Musikalische Zeitung gave an essentially positive review of Demmer's performance:

The Vienna correspondent of the Berlinische musikalische Zeitung edited by Johann Friedrich Reichardt wrote somewhat more sceptically:

The notice for the premiere of Beethoven's opera Leonore, oder Der Triumph der ehelichen Liebe (later revised as Fidelio), which took place on 20 November 1805 at the Theater an der Wien, then mentioned "Herr Demmer" in the role of Florestan. His partner was Anna Milder as Leonore, or Fidelio. The performance was a great failure for Beethoven, as even the protagonists were not given a good testimony: "Milder, despite her beautiful voice, had far too little affect and life for the role of Fidelio, and Demmer almost always intoned flat." The opera was performed only three times. Beethoven was also dissatisfied with Demmer's interpretation and replaced him with Joseph August Röckel at the premiere of the second version on 26 March 1806.

Among Demmer's great successes was the role of Ober-Seneschall in the Boildieu's singspiel Jean de Paris, which was first performed at the Theater an der Wien on 29 August 1812. The popular Cathinka Buchwieser appeared as the Princess of Navarre, and Demmer's daughter Josefine portrayed Lorezza. Curiously, his brother Christian Demmer played the same role at the same time in a production of the court theatre. Ignaz Franz Castelli writes in his memoirs:

On 14 April 1813, Demmer was registered as a court actor, living at Laimgrube No. 26. There is no record of him after 1824.

Family 
The marriage of Carl and Caroline Demmer produced several children who became important Viennese actresses and actors, among them:
 Friedrich Demmer (1785 in Berlin  – 15 April 1838 in Vienna), from September 1829 to 1834 as a singer, then until his death as chief director of the court opera
 Jeannette (Johanna) Schmidt, née Demmer (5 April 1794 in Weimar – 14 March 1862 in Vienna),
 Josefine Scutta, née Demmer (19 September 1795 in Frankfurt – 22 December 1863 in Vienna), wife of Andreas Scutta
 Thekla Demmer (1802 in Frankfurt – 23 August 1832 in Vienna).

Demmer was the brother of the singers and actors Joseph and Christian Demmer. His nephew was the opera singer Friedrich Demmer.

Further reading 
 Demmer Familie on OeML
 Matthäus Voll: Chronologisches Verzeichniß aller Schauspiele, deutschen und italienischen Opern, Pantomimen und Ballette, welche seit dem Monath April 1794 bis wieder dahin 1807, nämlich durch volle 13 Jahre sowohl in den k.-k. Hoftheatern als auch in den k-k. privil. Schauspielhäusern, vormahls auf der Wieden, nun an der Wien und in der Leopoldstadt aufgeführet worden sind. Wien 1807
 Ernst Pasqué: Goethe’s Theaterleitung in Weimar. Leipzig 1863, 
 Bruno Thomas Satori-Neumann: Die Frühzeit des Weimarischen Hoftheaters unter Goethes Leitung. Berlin 1922
 Alexander Wheelock Thayer: Ludwig van Beethovens Leben. Edited by Hermann Deiters, volume 2, 3rd edition., Leipzig 1922
 Theodor von Frimmel: Beethoven-Handbuch. Leipzig 1926, Band 1, p. 106f. 
 Klaus Wolfgang Niemöller: Kirchenmusik und reichsstädtische Musikpflege im Köln des 18. Jahrhunderts (Beiträge zur rheinischen Musikgeschichte, issue 39), Cologne 1960
 Albert Richard Mohr: Frankfurter Theater von der Wandertruppe zum Komödienhaus. Frankfurt 1967
 Willy Hess: Das Fidelio-Buch. Winterthur 1986
 Klaus Martin Kopitz: Der Düsseldorfer Komponist Norbert Burgmüller. Ein Leben zwischen Beethoven – Spohr – Mendelssohn. Kleve 1998, ; Dohr, Köln,

Notes

References 

Austrian stage actors
Austrian operatic tenors
1766 births
Year of death missing

Musicians from Cologne